Gyula Király (January 26, 1927 – January 17, 2011) was a literary historian who lived and worked in Budapest, Hungary.

Biography
Király was born in Santăul Mic (Kisszántó), a village in northwestern Romania, along the border with Hungary. He attended high school at the University of Debrecen, Hungary, then at the Gojdu High School in Oradea, Romania. He graduated from the Leningrad State University's Philology Department (1953). From 1953 to 1960 he was an assistant professor, and from 1953 to 1960 an adjunct lecturer in the Russian Philology Department of the Debrecen Kossuth Lajos University (KLTE ) in Budapest. From 1960 to 1964 he did post-doctoral studies at the Moscow Lomonosov University. From 1964 to 1968 he was adjunct lecturer, from 1969 to 1992 associate professor and in 1993 honorary professor in the Department of Russian Philology of Eötvös Loránd University (ELTE) In 1975-76 he was on scholarship at the Gorky Institute of World Literature.

Career
 1949-1953 studies at the Leningrad State (Zhdanov) University Arts Faculty
 1953-1960 assistant lecturer at Debrecen Kossuth Lajos University Faculty of Russian Philology
 1960-1964 postgraduate studies at the Moscow Lomonosov University
 1964-1970 senior lecturer at the ELTE Eötvös Loránd University Russian Faculty
 1969 PhD in Literary Sciences
 1970-2001 professor at the ELTE Eötvös József Collegium Russistic-Poetic Workshop
 1970-1993 associate professor at ELTE BTK Russian Faculty
 1993 honorary associate professor at ELTE BTK
 1993-1996 lecturing professor and scientific advisor at ELTE BTK Eastern, Slavic and Baltic Philology Department
 1996 lecturing professor at Károli Gáspár University of the Reformed Church in Hungary BTK World and Comparative Literature Department

Grants

 1960-1964	MTA-aspirantúra Hungarian Academy of Sciences, Moscow Lomonosov University
 1975-1976	Keldis-grant, Institute of World Literature (Gorky), Moscow
 1985		MTA Hungarian Academy of Sciences research grant, Jagellonian University, Slavic Institute, Cracow, Poland

Books
 Az orosz irodalom története a XIX. század második felében (1856-1900), Karancsy László – Király Gyula, Budapest, 1960. 336 p. (The History of Russian Literature in the Second Half of the Nineteenth Century, with László Karancsy)
 Élmények és gondolatok. Szovjet esszék, válogatás, jegyzetek Király Gyula, Európa Könyvkiadó, Budapest, 1965. 275p. (Experience and thought. Soviet essays - selection and commentaries)
 Poetika. Trudi russkih i sovetskih poetičeskih skol, válogatás, jegyzetek Király Gyula - Kovács Árpád, Tankönyvkiadó, Budapest, 1982. 800 p. (Poetics. Studies by Russian and Soviet schools of Poetics - Selection and commentaries with Árpád Kovács)
 Dosztojevszkij és az orosz próza. Műfajpoétikai tanulmányok, Akadémiai Kiadó, Budapest, 1983. 513p. (Dostoevsky and the Russian Prose)

Legacy

Király’s professional library will be donated to the Hungarian Academy of Sciences (MTA) it will be open to researchers.

References

External links

Gyula Kiraly

International Dostoevsky Society
https://dostoevsky.org/executive-board/

1927 births
2011 deaths
Literary theorists
Fyodor Dostoyevsky scholars
Literary scholars
People from Bihor County
Academic staff of the Károli Gáspár University of the Reformed Church in Hungary
Hungarian expatriates in Romania
Hungarian expatriates in the Soviet Union